Sarath is a village in Sarath CD block in the Madhupur subdivision of the Deoghar district in the Indian state of Jharkhand.

Geography

Location

Overview
The map shows a large area, which is a plateau with low hills, except in the eastern portion where the Rajmahal hills intrude into this area and the Ramgarh hills are there.  The south-western portion is just a rolling upland. The entire area is overwhelmingly rural with only small pockets of urbanisation.

Note: The full screen map is interesting. All places marked on the map are linked in the full screen map and one can easily move on to another page of his/her choice. Enlarge the full screen map to see what else is there – one gets railway connections, many more road connections and so on.

Area

Demographics
According to the 2011 Census of India, Sarath had a total population of 5,692, of which 2,981 (52%) were males and 2,711 (48%) were females. Population in the age range 0–6 years was 1,010. The total number of literate persons in Sarath was 4,682 (71.61% of the population over 6 years).

Civic administration

Police station
There is a police station at Sarath.

CD block HQ
Headquarters of Sarath CD block is at Sarath village.

Education
Kasturba Gandhi Balika Vidyalaya, Sarath, is a Hindi-medium girls only institution established in 2006. It has facilities for teaching from class VI to class XII.

High School Gopibandh is a Hindi-medium coeducational institution established in 1980. It has facilities for teaching from class VI to class X.

References

Villages in Deoghar district